Scottellia klaineana is a species of tree native to West and Central Africa. It usually grows to a height of about  but can grow taller. The timber is used for construction, panelling, joinery, furniture-making, cabinet work, carpentry, flooring, stairs, turnery and veneers.

References 

Achariaceae